César-François de Saussure (bap. 24 June 1705 – 8 March 1783) was a Swiss travel writer.

He was baptised in Lausanne, Pays de Vaud, Switzerland, the eldest son of a minister of the Reform Church, François-Louis de Saussure, and his wife, Jeanne-Emilie. After the death of his father in 1724, Saussure went travelling for fifteen years, arriving in London on 24 May 1725. He stayed there until October 1729. He travelled to Turkey and Switzerland before again staying in London from 1738 to 1740.

After returning to Switzerland, Saussure wrote down his travelling experiences. These were not published for over a century, when they were edited by two of his descendants.

Henri de Saussure (1708-1761), a younger brother of César-François de Saussure, emigrated from Lausanne to the English colony of South Carolina about 1730. Between them, the brothers maintained a correspondence for nearly 30 years. Largely unpublished, the surviving letters between César and his brother in America are now in university-affiliated archives in Lausanne and Geneva.

Works

Anne van Muyden-Baird (ed.), A Foreign View of England in the Reigns of George I and George II (1902; repr. 1995). A newer translation, by Paul Scott, appeared in 2006 under the title Letters from London, 1725-1730 (2006).
Berthold van Muyden (ed.), Lettres et voyages de Monsr César de Saussure en Allemagne, en Hollande et en Angleterre (Lausanne, Paris, and Amsterdam, 1903).

Notes

References
Vivienne Larminie, ‘Saussure, César-François de (1705–1783)’, Oxford Dictionary of National Biography, Oxford University Press, 2004, accessed 27 Aug 2014.

External links

1705 births
1783 deaths
18th-century travel writers
Swiss travel writers
Cesar-Francois